One Track Mind is an album by American indie rock band Railroad Jerk. It was released in 1995 on Matador Records.

Track listing
Gun Problem – 3:56
Bang The Drum – 	2:46
Rollerkoaster	 – 5:09
Riverboat (Vocals – Tony Lee) –  3:50
What Did You Expect?	 – 4:49
Home = Hang – 	3:50
Forty Minutes – 	4:28
The Ballad Of Railroad Jerk –  5:29
Big White Lady (Vocals – Alec Stephen)  – 2:39
Help Yourself	 – 4:25
You Better Go Now	 – 4:03
Some Girl Waved	 – 3:30
Zero Blues	 – 4:14

Personnel
Bass – Tony Lee
Drums – Dave Varenka
Engineer [Asst.] – Rob Polhemus
Guitar – Alec Stephen
Producer – Railroad Jerk
Recorded By, Producer – Settly
Vocals, Guitar – Marcellus Hall

References

1995 albums
Matador Records albums
Railroad Jerk albums